Bicyclus rhacotis, the Rhacotis bush brown, is a butterfly in the family Nymphalidae. It is found in Nigeria, Cameroon, Gabon, the Republic of the Congo, the Democratic Republic of the Congo, Uganda and north-western Tanzania. The habitat consists of deep forests.

References

Elymniini
Butterflies described in 1866
Butterflies of Africa
Taxa named by William Chapman Hewitson